The 2015–16 Florida Gulf Coast Eagles men's basketball team represented Florida Gulf Coast University (FGCU) in the 2015–16 NCAA Division I men's basketball season. FGCU was a member of the Atlantic Sun Conference. They played their home games at Alico Arena and were led by third year head coach Joe Dooley. They finished the season 21–14, 8–6 in A-Sun play to finish in a three-way tie for second place. They defeated Kennesaw State, North Florida, and Stetson to be champions of the A-Sun tournament. They received the conference's automatic bid to the NCAA tournament where they defeated Fairleigh Dickinson in the First Four to advance to the first round where they lost to North Carolina.

Pre-season
Departures

Arrivals

Class of 2015 Signees

Roster

Schedule 

|-
!colspan=9 style="background:#00885A; color:white;"| Regular season

|-
!colspan=9 style="background:#00885A; color:white;"| Atlantic Sun Conference regular season

|-
!colspan=12 style="background:#00885A; ; color:white;"| Atlantic Sun tournament

|-
!colspan=12 style="background:#00885A; ; color:white;"| NCAA tournament

References

Florida Gulf Coast Eagles men's basketball seasons
Florida Gulf Coast
Florida Gulf Coast